Novomukatovka (Yañı Moqatay) is a rural locality (a village) in Ryazanovsky Selsoviet, Sterlitamaksky District, Bashkortostan, Russia. The population was 6 as of 2010. There is 1 street.

Geography 
Novomukatovka is located 21 km northwest of Sterlitamak (the district's administrative centre) by road. Burikazganovo is the nearest rural locality.

References 

Rural localities in Sterlitamaksky District